Isabel Morse Jones (1892 – September 4, 1951) was an American musician, arts patron, and clubwoman. She was the music and dance critic at the Los Angeles Times, from 1925 to 1947.

Early life 
Isabel Morse was born in 1892 in Cleveland, Ohio, the daughter of Arthur Mason Morse. She was raised in Los Angeles, California. She attended Los Angeles High School and the University of California, Los Angeles. She was a descendant of painter and inventor Samuel Morse. By 1915, she was living in Hermosa Beach, California, and hosting musical events at her home.

Career

Music and dance 
Jones taught violin and played violin and cello in the Los Angeles Women's Symphony Orchestra. From 1925 until 1947, she was music and dance critic at the Los Angeles Times. She worked with her friend, society page editor Crete Cage, to built support for a new concert hall for the Los Angeles Philharmonic. She admired the modern dance of Martha Graham, but admitted that it wasn't for all dance lovers: "Graham either grips you with the power and truth of her creations or you resent her. There is no middle course." She also wrote about music on the Pacific Coast for the Christian Science Monitor and the magazine Musical America.

Jones lectured on music to community and professional groups, and spoke about music on Los Angeles radio programs. She was a founder of the Los Angeles Bureau of Music, and a founding member of the Los Angeles County Music Commission. She also supported the founding of Henry Cowell's New Music Society in Los Angeles, in 1925.

Hollywood Bowl 
Jones served a press agent for the Hollywood Bowl, and wrote a history of the venue in 1936. She favorably reviewed Frank Sinatra's Hollywood Bowl concert with the Los Angeles Philharmonic in 1943, saying "He is a romantic and a dreamer and a careful dresser and he loves beautiful words and music is his hobby."

Personal life 
Isabel Morse married Dr. Carroll Welborn Jones in 1923. They had a daughter, Carolyn Mason Jones, who became a noted opera photographer. Isabel Morse Jones died while staying with her daughter in Rome in 1951.

References 

1892 births
1951 deaths
American cellists
American music critics
American women music critics
People from Cleveland
American violinists
Los Angeles Times people
The Christian Science Monitor people
Los Angeles High School alumni
University of California, Los Angeles alumni
People from Hermosa Beach, California
20th-century cellists